Coleophora terenaula is a moth of the family Coleophoridae. It is found in South Africa.

References

Endemic moths of South Africa
terenaula
Moths of Africa
Moths described in 1927